Shuanggui is an internal disciplinary process conducted by the Central Commission for Discipline Inspection of the Chinese Communist Party (CCP) – and its lower-level affiliates – on members of the Party who are suspected of "violations of discipline," a charge which usually refers to corruption but can occasionally carry other connotations as well. The Shuanggui process is conducted in secret, in a system which is separate from ordinary Chinese law enforcement. Generally, subjects are isolated from any form of legal counsel or even family visits during the process. Some journalists maintain that the practice has been involved in extraordinary renditions. It is an extrajudicial process outside of the control of the Chinese State.

By the point the party member is informed of their Shuanggui, the party disciplinary agencies have often already found enough evidence behind the scenes to establish guilt. As such, being taken to Shuanggui is usually taken as an indictment with presumed guilt despite party regulations which stipulate a presumption of innocence. Party investigators often turn the suspect over to the formal system of prosecution, that is, the procuratorate, if the member is deemed to be guilty, which is most times the case. The system has been described variously as an effective way to root out corruption but also as depriving its subjects of basic legal rights. There have been reports of Shuanggui subjects being tortured to extract forced confessions.

Etymology
The term "Shuanggui" means "at an appointed time and place": as "shuang" means double, "gui" meaning appointed, or designated. The term is an abbreviation of codified disciplinary procedures inside the Party which states that a member must "be present at a designated time and designated location", hence 'double designated', "...to provide explanations on issues related to an ongoing case." The term in Chinese may also used as a passive voice form, for example, someone could be "shuanggui'd”.

Administrative Supervision Law Article 20 (3) also provides that "personnel under investigation shall not be detained in any manner". However, in many cases, personnel may still be detained or even be hurt. On 9 April 2013, Yu Qiyi, a state-owned enterprise cadre, was killed during the shuanggui process.

Legal basis
The legal foundation of the shuanggui system is a matter of some controversy and dispute. Both the Chinese Communist Party discipline inspection organs cases inspection regulations Article 28 (3) and the Administrative Supervision Law of the People's Republic of China Article 20 (3) provide that "Order personnel under investigation for suspicion of violating administrative disciplines to make explanations of the matters under investigation at an appointed time and place; however, personnel under investigation shall not be detained in any manner".

Nonetheless, Shuanggui was introduced in 1990 in order to get around the rule that public security departments can detain suspects for no more than 24 hours.

Procedures
The process of shuanggui has been shrouded in secrecy for many decades. In recent years much more light has been shed on the internal workings of the shuanggui system, both by Chinese media and by foreign press.

When Party members are removed from their places of work for shuanggui, they are typically held in isolation. They have no access to legal counsel, and are usually not allowed to have contact with their families. Every year, several thousand Party members are believed to be secretly detained for weeks and months under the system. Party officials say that nearly 90 percent of "major corruption cases" are cracked through the use of shuanggui.

In 2013 anti-corruption officials investigated 173,000 cases of corruption using shuanggui. Three people died during these interrogations. In one case, six Party interrogators, who tortured state engineer Yu Qiyi to death, were sentenced to prison.

In early 2014 Zhou Wangyan provided a detailed description of his time under shuanggui. He told the Associated Press that he had been severely tortured during interrogation, in an effort to have him confess to a charge of bribery which he says he did not commit.

CCP interrogators forced his legs apart until his left thigh bone snapped with a loud "ka-cha" noise. Zhou said that he was deprived of sleep and food, nearly drowned, whipped with wires, and forced to consume feces. Other party officials told the Associated Press that they were "turned into human punching bags, strung up by the wrists from high windows, or dragged along the floor, face down, by their feet."

The actions taken against those in the custody of the Shuanggui system are designed to extract confessions. There is no external oversight of shuanggui facilities, allowing the Party to "abuse its own members in its own secret jails with impunity". Police officials who receive complaints of torturous and abusive shuanggui procedures are not allowed to investigate them.

Notable cases
A list of notable officials or Party cadres who have been subjected to shuanggui based on accusations of corruption or violations of CCP discipline:
 Bo Xilai
 Chen Xitong
 Chen Liangyu
 Cheng Kejie
 Ji Jianye
 Yu Qiyi
 Ling Jihua
 Mao Xiaoping
 Meng Hongwei

References

Chinese Communist Party
Extraordinary rendition program
Torture
Enforced disappearance